LUMS, a university in Pakistan located in Lahore, launched its National Outreach Programme (NOP) in 2011 to extend the benefits of world-class education to students all over Pakistan and thereby become a truly national university.

Process for participation
The process includes:
 Working with schools, colleges, boards of intermediate and secondary education and education NGOs to identify all talented students from across the country
 Encouraging these bright students at the matric and intermediate level to pursue education at LUMS
 Providing assistance to potential applicants to prepare for the LUMS Common Admission Test (LCAT) Reasoning Test by arranging coaching sessions at LUMS
 Providing full financial assistance (covering tuition, registration etc.), free hostel accommodation, living and books allowance to those candidates who qualify for admissions through the NOPjkg

Eligibility criteria
Eligibility criteria for the NOP are at least 80% marks in Matriculation exams and financial need. The applicants shortlisted on the above criteria appear in the Preliminary Evaluation Test.

After being selected on the basis of this test the students are coached. Then, the students are shortlisted on the basis of their performance in the quizzes and tests taken during this coaching session, and registered for the entrance test, fully funded by LUMS. Finally, the students who apply to LUMS and qualify on merit, are offered admission on full scholarship. There is no separate quota for NOP candidates. All students, whether they apply directly or through NOP, are evaluated on the same admission
criteria. As regards assessment of financial need, a review committee has been established to ensure transparency in the process of awarding scholarships to all those who qualify for the admissions through the NOP.

Application process
Students apply to the NOP after clearing their Matriculation exam. Application is normally at least two years ahead of the undergraduate programme start date — students applying in 2010 will be able to join the programme in 2012. Hence, the students of Intermediate parts I and II are eligible to apply.

Preliminary Evaluation Test
Students take the Preliminary Evaluation Test which is based on the Matriculation and Intermediate curricula. It comprises three sections: English, Mathematics and Analytical. Each section has multiple-choice questions. The duration of the test can be 75 to 90 minutes. Students are shortlisted for the coaching session on the basis of your performance in this test. A sample test paper is available online on the LUMS website.

Summer coaching session
If students are selected on the basis of the Preliminary Evaluation Test, LUMS offer a three-week coaching session at LUMS and selected cities. These tests are arranged during summer vacations (July and August) every year. All expenses with regard to boarding, lodging and coaching materials are borne by LUMS.

The candidates are shortlisted on the basis of their performance in Coaching Session and are registered for SAT Reasoning Test. The application fo

Admission criteria
Students are selected for admission to the undergraduate programme on evaluation of the following:
 SAT Reasoning Test
 Academic Record – 00 years of education
 A Level, at least 2bs and 1C grade in three principle subjects. No credit will be given to Advanced Subsidiary, General Paper.
 FA, at least 70% marks
 FSc, at least 70% marks

External links
 LUMS - National Outreach Programme

Education in Lahore
Lahore University of Management Sciences
Scholarships in Pakistan